Prethopalpus attenboroughi, or Attenborough's goblin spider, is a tiny spider named after Sir David Attenborough, that is found only on Horn Island off northern Queensland in Australia. The millimeter-long spider was described in 2012 by Dr Barbara Baehr of the Queensland Museum and Professor Mark Harvey of the Western Australian Museum.

The male type specimen was collected in 1986; the female is unknown.

See also
List of things named after David Attenborough and his works

References

External links

New species named for Sir David Attenborough WA Museum news, 4 August 2012

Oonopidae
Spiders of Australia
Spiders described in 2012